is a water polo player from Japan. He was part of the Japanese team at the 2016 Summer Olympics, where the team was eliminated in the group stage.

References

Japanese male water polo players
Living people
1995 births
Olympic water polo players of Japan
Water polo players at the 2016 Summer Olympics
Asian Games silver medalists for Japan
Asian Games medalists in water polo
Water polo players at the 2014 Asian Games
Water polo players at the 2018 Asian Games
Medalists at the 2014 Asian Games
Medalists at the 2018 Asian Games
Water polo players at the 2020 Summer Olympics
21st-century Japanese people